Abraham Robarts may refer to:

Abraham Wildey Robarts, MP
Abraham Robarts (MP for Worcester)